San Miguel de Aguayo is a municipality located in the autonomous community of Cantabria, Spain.

Localities
Its 153 inhabitants (INE, 2008) are distributed in the villages of:
 San Miguel de Aguayo (Capital), 97 hab.
 Santa María de Aguayo, 56 hab.
 Santa Olalla de Aguayo, 7 hab.

References

Municipalities in Cantabria